Ustyevka is a rural locality (a village) in Truntaishevsky Selsoviet, Alsheyevsky District, Bashkortostan, Russia. The population was 7 as of 2010. There is 1 street.

Geography 
Ustyevka is located 27 km northwest of Rayevsky (the district's administrative centre) by road. Adamovka is the nearest rural locality.

References 

Rural localities in Alsheyevsky District